Rafael Donato may refer to:

 Rafael Donato (academic) (1938–2006), Filipino academic, linguist, and university president
 Rafael Donato (footballer) (born 1989), Brazilian footballer